Apollonio may refer to:

Giorgia Apollonio (b. 1988), Italian curler
Federica Apollonio (b. 1991), Italian curler
Nicholas Apollonio, (1843–1911) American baseball franchise owner
Zvest Apollonio, (1935–2009) Slovenian painter
Giacomo Apollonio, (1584–1654) Italian painter
Apollonios of Kition, ancient Greek physician
Agostino Apollonio, Italian renaissance painter
Apollonio Buonfratelli, Italian renaissance miniature painter

See also
 Apolonio, a 2020 mixtape by Omar Apollo

Masculine given names